Thomas Miller was an English footballer who played in the Football League for Bolton Wanderers.

References

Date of birth unknown
Date of death unknown
English footballers
Association football forwards
English Football League players
Bolton Wanderers F.C. players